The Best of Buffy Sainte-Marie Vol. 2 is a compilation double album released by Vanguard Records in 1971 covering a large proportion of the material she had released on her first six albums for the label that was not found on the previous year's The Best of Buffy Sainte-Marie.

Unlike her other first compilation, The Best of Buffy Sainte-Marie Vol. 2 does contain two tracks that were never released on any album - "Gonna Feel Much Better When You're Gone", which was never otherwise released, and "From the Bottom of My Heart", which was available on the "I'm Gonna Be a Country Girl Again" single that was charting in the UK at the time.

Track listing 
All tracks composed by Buffy Sainte-Marie except where indicated.
 "It's My Way"1 - 3:34
 "He's a Pretty Good Man If You Ask Me"5 - 2:28
 "Hey Little Bird"4 - 2:13
 "Song to a Seagull"4 (Joni Mitchell) - 3:22
 "Adam"6 (Richie Havens) - 5:05
 "Mary"6 - 1:32
 "He Lived Alone in Town"1 - 4:41
 "Johnny Be Fair"2 - 1:49
 "Reynardine" [A Vampire Legend]4 (Traditional) - 2:59
 "Gonna Feel Much Better When You're Gone"8 - 1:49
 "Tall Trees in Georgia"5 - 3:33
 "The Carousel"4 - 2:33
 "Poppies"6 - 2:51
 "From the Bottom of My Heart"7 - 2:34
 "Lyke Wake Dirge"4 (Benjamin Britten/Traditional) - 3:48
 "Welcome, Welcome Emigrante"2 - 2:16
 "Eyes of Amber"1 - 2:20
 "Babe in Arms"1 - 2:33
 "Ananias"1 - 2:40
 "97 Men in This Here Town"/"Don't Call Me Honey"8 - 3:06
 "Uncle Joe"5 (Traditional) - 2:11
 "T'es pas un autre" ("Until It's Time for You to Go")4 - 2:57
 "The Seeds of Brotherhood"4 - 1:29
 "The Angel"6 (Ed Freeman) - 3:25

 1 - From It's My Way!
 2 - From Many a Mile
 3 - From Little Wheel Spin and Spin
 4 - From Fire & Fleet & Candlelight
 5 - From I'm Gonna Be a Country Girl Again
 6 - From Illuminations
 7 - Unavailable on album; B-side of single "I'm Gonna Be a Country Girl Again"
 8 -  Previously unreleased

References 

Buffy Sainte-Marie albums
Albums produced by Maynard Solomon
1971 greatest hits albums
Vanguard Records compilation albums